Sukrimangela railway station is a main railway station in Jabalpur district, Madhya Pradesh. Its code is SOY. It serves Mandla city. The station consists of two platforms, neither not well sheltered. It lacks many facilities including water and sanitation. Mandla is served by a narrow-gauge railway from Nainpur, where it connects to the narrow-gauge line between Jabalpur and Gondia. Gauge conversion has already started.

Major train 

 Sukrimangela–Jabalpur Passenger

References

Railway stations in Jabalpur district
Nagpur CR railway division